Acleris semiannula is a species of moth of the family Tortricidae. It is found in North America, where it has been recorded from Alberta, British Columbia, Illinois, Maine, Maryland, Mississippi, New Brunswick, New York, Ohio, Ontario, Pennsylvania, Quebec, South Carolina, West Virginia and Wisconsin.

The wingspan is 12–15 mm. The forewings are usually light red-brown, but may also be pale to fawn and sometimes even dull smoky grey. The costal triangle is often composed of red-brown scales, but may also be dark brown. Adults have been recorded on wing year round.

The larvae feed on Acer rubrum, Acer saccharinum and Quercus alba.

References

Moths described in 1869
semiannula
Moths of North America